Kottaikkadu is a small village in Tuticorin district (Tamil Nadu), belongs to Srivaikundam Taluk and Siruthonda Nallore panchayat.

Etymology 
All four sides of the village are bounded by forest, so the village is named as Kottai Kadu. In Tamil, Kottai means "Fort" and Kadu means "Forest".

 Nearest Town : Eral, Tuticorin
 Nearest Railway Station: Tuticorin / Kurumbur / Tirunelveli / Tiruchendur 
 Nearest Airport: Tuticorin / Madurai / Trivandrum
 STD Code: +91-4630

Village economy
Total number of houses are 150 and population is around 800, with 56% of Male and 44% of female.

It is primarily an agricultural village.  Mainly they are farming Rice, Banana and Coconut.  It is an ever green village, at least one cow is in every family.  All houses are electrified and own a television.

Education
All people have completed their primary education. Nowadays, all people have completed their 8th standard. A primary school is there, around 90 students (also from the nearby villages) are learning their primary education at this school. For higher education, they are going to various places like Eral (2 km), Sawyerpuram(6 km), Panikkanadarkudiyiruppu (8 km). 

Around 20 persons have completed their graduation in engineering.  Every year at least 4 students are getting graduation in various disciplines of arts and science.

References

Villages in Thoothukudi district